Maharaja Shalinder (409 AD), was a Taxak Jat ruler of the regions of Shalpur (Sialkot in present day Pakistan) in 5th century AD. In the beginning of the Fifth century, there was the ruler Maharaja Shalinder with his rule extending from Punjab to Malwa and Rajasthan.

Due to the attack of Hunas, the kingdom of Shalinder fell and the descendants moved to Malwa. In 540AD Vira Chandra's son Shali Chandra built a temple in the village Kanswa on the banks of the Taveli river. This temple contained an inscription in the memory of their rule. According to the inscription at Kanswa, found from a well near the Chambal River south of Kota, King Shalinder calls himself of the Saura race and Takshak clan. In the inscription it is written that King Shalinder, the progenitor of the royal family, was also Taxshak Vanshi.

Successors of Shalinder

Shalindra (409 AD) → Devngli → Sambuka → Degalli (Yadu wives) → Vira Narendra → Vira Chandra → Shali Chandra (540 AD)

References 

Hindu dynasties
Jat rulers
Ancient kings